Stephen Rosen may refer to:

Stephen Peter Rosen, professor of national security and military affairs at Harvard University
Steven M. Rosen (born 1942), Canadian psychologist and philosopher
Steve J. Rosen, former policy director of American Israel Public Affairs Committee
Steven J. Rosen (born 1955), American author, also known as Satyaraja Dasa
Steven A. Rosen (born 1954), archaeologist
Steven T. Rosen, American oncologist